Tentax brunnea is a moth of the family Erebidae first described by Michael Fibiger in 2011. It is found in northern Vietnam.

The wingspan is about 11.5 mm. The forewings are brown, including the subterminal, terminal areas and fringes. There is a blackish brown quadrangular patch at the upper medial area. The costa is basally black, subapically with small black dots. The crosslines are reddish brown. The terminal line is indicated by indistinct, black interveinal dots. The hindwings are grey. The underside of the forewings is unicolorous brown and the underside of the hindwings is grey with a discal spot.

References

Micronoctuini
Taxa named by Michael Fibiger
Moths described in 2011